Hideji (written: 秀治, 秀司 or ひで次) is a masculine Japanese given name. Notable people with the name include:

, Japanese writer and playwright
, Japanese baseball player
, Japanese manga artist
, Japanese actor

Japanese masculine given names